Gavrilov-Yam is a town and the administrative center of Gavrilov-Yamsky (or Gavrilov-Yamskiy) District in Yaroslavl Oblast, Russia, located on the Kotorosl River. Population:

History

The first mention of a settlement on the site of modern Gavrilov-Yam dates back to 1545. Then it was a small village of Gavrilovo, in which there were only 7 courtyards and it belonged to the Varnitsky Trinity-Sergius Monastery. 

At the end of the 16th century, by decree of Tsar Ivan the Terrible, the village was renamed into Gavrilov Yam, later into Gavrilov-Yamskaya Sloboda, and at the end of the 18th century, in connection with the construction of a stone church - and into the village of Gavrilov-Yam. Town status was granted in 1938.

In the early 2000s, the weaving production of the Moscow-based factory, Trekhgornaya Manufactory, was transferred to the oblast to which the town belongs.

The Gavrilov-Yamskiy Flax Mill traces its history back to the Lokalov textile factory. The mill carries out all stages of flax processing, from flax-combed production to finished products (linen and mixed fabrics, patterned tablecloths, napkins, towels, etc). The plant is the only one in the country that produces art canvas.

Administrative and municipal status
Within the framework of administrative divisions, Gavrilov-Yam serves as the administrative center of the Gavrilov-Yamsky (or Gavrilov-Yamskiy) District. As an administrative division, it is incorporated within Gavrilov-Yamsky (or Gavrilov-Yamskiy)  District as the town of district significance of Gavrilov-Yam. As a municipal division, the town of district significance of Gavrilov-Yam is incorporated within Gavrilov-Yamsky (Gavrilov-Yamskiy) Municipal District as Gavrilov-Yam Urban Settlement.

References

Notes

Sources

External links

Official website of Gavrilov-Yam 
Gavrilov-Yam Business Directory 

Cities and towns in Yaroslavl Oblast
Yaroslavsky Uyezd
Monotowns in Russia